The Knesset Guard (Mishmar HaKnesset) is an Israeli protective security unit. The Knesset Guard is responsible for the security of the Knesset building and protection of Knesset members (MKs).

Guards are stationed outside the building, and ushers are on duty inside. The commander of the force is called the Sergeant-at-Arms (K'tzin HaKnesset, literally, "officer of the Knesset"). In addition to its everyday duties, the Knesset Guard plays a ceremonial role, greeting dignitaries and taking part in the annual ceremony on Mount Herzl on the eve of Israeli Independence Day.

History
On October 29, 1957 Moshe Dwek threw a grenade during a plenary session of the Knesset. Minister Haim Moshe Shapiro, Prime Minister David Ben-Gurion and Minister of Foreign Affairs Golda Meir were injured. Following the events the Israeli Police decided to establish the Knesset Guard in 1958.
 
The Status and Authority were regulated as part of Knesset Guard Law from 1968. First Knesset Officer was Yerachmiel Belkin.

Weapons
Knesset Guards are armed with IMI Tavor TAR-21 and IMI Galil rifles.

Ranks

References

External links
The Knesset Guard on the Knesset Virtual Tour
Video clip depicting the Guard's establishment

Police units of Israel
Israeli Security Forces
Protective security units
Knesset
Guards regiments
Guards of honour
Parliament police services